There are a number of indoor ice rinks in African countries that are used for ice hockey. Enthusiasts have formed national teams in several countries and an inaugural African Nations Cup of Ice Hockey was planned for 2009.

The first African Nations Cup of Ice Hockey was planned for South Africa between 19–26 September 2009. The matches of the championship were to be played at the ice rink of "Festival Shopping Centre" in Kempton Park. The competing countries were to be South Africa, Morocco and Algeria. However, the tournament was postponed due to lack of response from the invited countries and never played.

In 2014, the Egyptian players of Anubis Ice Hockey Team, Egypt's first ice hockey team started to initiate with the Royal Moroccan Ice Hockey Federation the first African Cup. In 2016 the first African Ice Hockey Clubs Cup was held in Rabat, Morocco between 24 and 31 July. The championship was contested between 6 teams from Egypt, Morocco , Tunisia and Algeria. Teams of Kenya, Libya and South Africa were also invited but they didn't participate. The cup was won by the Tunisian team.

Southern Africa

South Africa
In South Africa, the sport is governed by the South African Ice Hockey Association. The South Africa national ice hockey team has been a member of the International Ice Hockey Federation (IIHF) since 1937 and are arguably the leading Ice Hockey nation on the continent with various of its players also playing college ice hockey in the USA. South Africa made its international debut in a 12-3 loss to Yugoslavia in Group C of the 1961 World Ice Hockey Championships. South African Super League teams include the Johannesburg Wildcats, Pretoria Capitals and the Cape Town Kings.

North Africa

Morocco
The North western African country of Morocco has a number of ice hockey clubs like the Capitals, Ifis and Falcons who use a rink in a shopping mall in Rabat.
Ice hockey is governed in Morocco by the Royal Moroccan Ice Hockey Federation which is so far an associate member of the IIHF since 2010. The Morocco national ice hockey team represented their country in the 2008 Arab Cup of Ice Hockey, in Dubai.

Algeria
Algeria became Associate members of the IIHF on September 26, 2019. There is currently one ice rink in Algeria. Ice hockey in Algeria is governed by Hockey Algeria. Algeria currently has one hockey club, HC Alger Corsaires and a hockey school in Setif.

Tunisia
Tunisia's first ice rink is at the Blue Ice complex in the Yasmine Hammamet resort.
Tunisia national ice hockey team is being formed by the ice hockey player Ihab Ayed from France, and it is governed by the Tunisian Ice Hockey Association The Tunisian team 'Carthage Eagles' is the first champion of Africa.

Egypt
Egypt, has 11 ice rinks in 6 cities in six different governorates.

East Africa

Kenya
In 2005, the Solar Ice Rink was opened in the Panari Hotel in Nairobi, Kenya. Several Kenyan schools have shown interest in setting up ice hockey teams.
Ice hockey players from Djibouti are known to participate in some ice hockey matches in other African countries.

Future of African ice hockey
So far there is no unifying African federation for ice hockey to govern the sport in the large continent. However, 12 African countries have different levels of ice hockey activities, South Africa is a full member of the IIHF with a national federation, ice hockey rinks, clubs and national teams. Morocco is an associate member of the IIHF with a national federation, a few clubs and a national team. Namibia has a national federation with an affiliate membership in the IIHF, but it doesn't have a national ice hockey team. Tunisia has a national team and a national association but still with no IIHF membership. While in Egypt, Kenya, Côte d'Ivoire, there are several clubs and teams with no official statuses.

References

 
Sport in Africa